Clethra pachyphylla is a tree in the family Clethraceae. The specific epithet  is from the Greek meaning "thick leaves".

Description
The fissured bark is pale grey. The scented flowers are white.

Distribution and habitat
Clethra pachyphylla is endemic to Malaysian Borneo.

References

pachyphylla
Endemic flora of Borneo
Trees of Borneo
Plants described in 1918
Flora of the Borneo montane rain forests